Te Tautua is the smaller of the two main settlements on Penrhyn Atoll in the Cook Islands. It is located on Pokerekere Islet (also known as Pokerere or Tautua).

References
 

Populated places in the Cook Islands
Penrhyn atoll